It's Never Too Late is a 1953 Italian comedy film directed by Filippo Walter Ratti. The film is based on the 1843 novella A Christmas Carol by Charles Dickens.

Plot
Antonio Trabbi is a greedy old man with a very rough personality and obsessed by money. He deprecates charity and love and has no friends or love interest, being lonely and avoided by people. On Christmas Eve he is visited by the ghost of his former business partner, who warns him about his life-style and announces the visit of three spirits, who will show Antonio past, present and future Christmas days. During the night, the three spirits actually appear to Trabbi, showing him his sad past, the bad reputation he has with everyone and the bad outcome of his actions, which will lead him to a lonely death and to terrible punishments in Hell. When Trabbi wakes up he is greatly distressed by the visions and eager to change his life, starting with that very same Christmas Day.

Cast
 Paolo Stoppa as Antonio Trabbi
 Guglielmo Barnabò
 Isa Barzizza as Rosanna Gennari
 Luigi Batzella (as Gigi Batzella)
 Sergio Bergonzelli
 Lola Braccini as Antonio's mother
 Arturo Bragaglia as L'omino
 Enzo Cerusico as Antonio as child
 Olinto Cristina as Franci
 Giorgio De Lullo as The Strange Man in the Pub
 Giulio Donnini as Orazio Colussi
 Attilio Dottesio as The man who poses the riddle at the party
 Leda Gloria as Anna Colussi
 Susanne Lévesy as Giulia - Daniele's wife
 Ellida Lorini as Rosanna as child
 Marcello Mastroianni as Riccardo
 Leonilde Montesi
 Valeria Moriconi as Marta
 Luisa Rivelli
 Daniela Spallotta
 Luigi Tosi as Daniele Trabbi

See also
List of Christmas films
List of ghost films
Adaptations of A Christmas Carol

References

External links

1953 films
1950s Christmas films
1950s Christmas comedy films
Italian Christmas comedy films
1950s Italian-language films
Italian black-and-white films
Films based on A Christmas Carol
1950s Italian films